Hair multiplication or hair cloning is a proposed technique to counter hair loss. The technology to clone hair is in its early stages.  Experts previously assumed that in the case of complete baldness, follicles are completely absent from the scalp, so they cannot be regenerated. However, it was discovered that the follicles are not entirely absent, as there are stem cells in the bald scalp from which the follicles naturally arise. Abnormal behavior of these follicles is suggested to be the result of progenitor cell deficiency in these areas.

The basic idea of hair cloning is that healthy follicle cells or dermal papillae can be extracted from the subject from areas that are not bald and are not suffering hair loss. They can be multiplied (cloned) by various culturing methods and the new cells can be injected back in the bald scalp, where they would produce healthy hair. In 2015, initial trials for human hair were successful in generating new follicles, but the hairs grew in various different directions, giving an unnatural look. As of 2019, scientists believe they may have solved this problem by using nearly microscopic 3D printed shafts to assist follicles growing upward through the scalp. This technique however is still in research phase and is not available for public or commercial use.

Research

Intercytex
One of the first companies to begin experimenting with hair cloning was Intercytex. Researchers at the company were convinced that their approach was the cure for baldness, and if the technology is fully developed, they can basically eliminate hair loss due to hereditary factors. This therapy would also eliminate the need for donor hair, as it can be simply grown from the patient's own cells.

Intercytex tried to clone new hair follicles from the stem cells harvested from the back of the neck. They hoped that if they multiplied (cloned) the follicles and then implanted them back in the scalp in the bald areas they would be successful in regrowing the hair itself. They tested the method in their Phase II trials, which showed very promising results as two-thirds of the bald male patients were able to grow new hair after the treatment.

The company was hoping to complete the research so they can make it available to the public, so they began Phase III trials. They estimated they would be able to finish the process in a few years. However, these tests did not show the expected progress. In 2008 Intercytex admitted that they failed in fully developing the hair cloning therapy and decided to discontinue all research.

This was not solely the result of the failed tests, as the company's financial background also became unstable in 2008 and they had to implement several cost-cutting measures. They laid off a great number of staff members and cut funding to the research projects such as hair cloning. In 2010 they went out of business.

Aderans Research Institute
Another firm researching hair cloning was ARI (Aderans Research Institute), a Japanese company which operated in the US and was the greatest competitor of Intercytex in developing the therapy. The company worked on what they called the "Ji Gami" process, which involved the removal of a small strip of the scalp, which is broken down into individual follicular stem cells. After the extraction these cells are cultured, multiplied and injected back into the bald areas of the scalp. Scientists hoped that after implantation these cloned follicular cells would mature into full grown hair.

During Phase II trials they found that the process was not suitable for multiplication but instead it revitalized the follicles and successfully prevented future loss. The trials continued in 2012.
Aderans decided to discontinue the funding of its hair multiplication research in July 2013.

Berlin Technical University
The first time scientists were able to grow artificial hair follicles from stem cells was in 2010. Scientists of the Berlin Technical University in Germany took animal cells and created the follicles by using them. As a result, they produced follicles "thinner than normal", but they were confident they could develop the right method of cloning hair from human stem cells by 2011. They estimated that the therapy would be publicly available by 2015 as they were already preparing for the clinical trials. Scientists working on the project said if the treatment was finished, it would mean a cure for approximately 80 percent of those who suffer from hair loss.

The university was working together with Intercytex and several other research teams, but they encountered several problems. One of them was that the multiplication process was not efficient enough. They were only able to clone one or two follicles from an extracted hair but for the process to be efficient this number should have been around 1000. There was no indication that researchers were able to overcome this obstacle.

University of Pennsylvania
In 2012 scientists from the University of Pennsylvania School of Medicine published their own findings regarding hair cloning. During their investigation they found that non-bald and bald scalps have the same number of stem cells, but progenitor cell number was significantly depleted in the case of the latter. Based on this, they concluded that it is not the absence of the stem cells that is responsible for the hair loss but the unsuccessful activation of said cells.

The researchers continued their investigation and are looking for a way to convert regular stem cells into progenitor cells, which could mean they may be able to activate the natural generation of hair on a previously bald scalp.

Durham University
In late 2013, new results were published by a research team at the Durham University which suggested progress. The scientists tried a new method for multiplying, cloning the original cells not in a 2D but in a 3D system.

A team took healthy dermal papillae from hair transplants and dissected them, then cultured them in a petri dish. In 30 hours they were able to produce 3000 dermal papilla cells. The goal was to create dermal papillae that when injected would reprogram cells around it to produce healthy hair. They chose to try the method by injecting the cloned cells in foreskin samples to "challenge" the cells, as the cells in foreskin normally don't grow hair. The human skin samples were grafted on rats. After six weeks the cloned papillae cells formed brand new hair follicles which were able to grow hair.

These are early results and as it is a new approach to hair cloning, several more studies and tests have to be conducted before they can move on to human testing. They also encountered new problems, such as that some of the newly grown hair appeared without pigmentation.

RepliCel Life Sciences
Vancouver-based firm, RepliCel Life Sciences Inc. has been researching the replacing of hormone-compromised hair-follicle cells.

In 2013, RepliCel created a partnership with cosmetics company Shiseido, giving Shiseido an exclusive license to use its RCH-01 technology in Japan, China, South Korea, Taiwan and the ASEAN countries. Shiseido trialed RepliCel's RCH-01 in Japan and received modest results. In 2021, RepliCel initiated arbitration against Shiseido and terminated the company's license agreement.

Riken Centre for Developmental Biology 
In 2016, scientists in Japan led by announced they had successfully grown human skin in a lab. The skin was created using induced pluripotent stem cells, and when implanted in a mouse, the skin grew hairs successfully. Dr. Takashi Tsuji has sought crowdfunding for the group's research. The group has also formed a partnership with Organ Technologies and Kyocera Corporation to commercially develop the research. Organ Technologies was renamed to OrganTech in 2023.

Stemson Therapeutics 
In July 2019, a researcher from San Diego-based Stemson Therapeutics, partnered with UCSD, successfully grew his own follicles on a mouse using iPSC-derived epithelial and dermal cell therapy. The hair grew straight and was aligned properly with a 3D printed biodegradable shaft. The hairs were permanent and regenerated naturally.

dNovo Bio 
dNovo, a Silicon-valley based company, was founded in 2018 and participated in the Y Combinator accelerator. The company has demonstrated its technology by growing a patch of human hair on a mouse.

See also 
 Hair loss
 Follicular unit transplantation

References

Further reading
Cell Therapy for Hair Loss
Hair restoration
Haarklinik (in German)
Human hair
Tissue engineering
Trichology